Shikarpur is a town in Muzaffarnagar District, Uttar Pradesh, India. It is situated on the right bank of the Hindon River, with a railway station, 30 km south east of the district capital Muzaffarnagar.

Shikarpur had a mosque built by the Mughal Emperor Humayun. It has a beautiful Temple and Fort. 

Cities and towns in Muzaffarnagar district